Passion is the first album by the Canadian singer Kreesha Turner. It was released on August 12, 2008, in Canada and in early 2009 in the United States. Passion became available for advanced streaming on MuchMusic.com. a week earlier.

In early August, 2008, the album was leaked onto MTV Canada's The Leak on its official website.

Although Turner originally signed in the US to Virgin Records, a Capitol Music Group label, her first American release was instead on the Capitol Records imprint, also within the Capitol Music Group. This maintained consistency with her Canadian releases under EMI Music Canada which uses the Capitol Records imprint and are copyrighted by Capitol Records, LLC.

Singles
Six singles were released from the album, one exclusively to Canada. The first single, "Simple" was released on November 13, 2007, on iTunes as a single and as an EP. Despite positive reviews, the single did not chart.

"Bounce With Me", was released on December 4, 2007. The song peaked at number 53 on the Canadian Hot 100, number 64 on the Hot Canadian Digital Singles, and number 11 on the Hot Canadian Emerging Artists Songs.

"Don't Call Me Baby charted at number 8 on the Canadian Hot 100, and number 1 on the U.S. Billboard Hot Dance Club Play, number 16 on the International Global Dance Tracks chart, and number 1 on the Hot Canadian Emerging Artists Songs chart.

"Lady Killer" was not as successful, topping out at 54 on the Canadian Hot 100.

"Talk", was sent exclusively to Canadian radio, the album's only radio single. The song did not chart.

"Passion" was released first to the U.S. on September 26, 2008, and was unsuccessful. It was released in Canada on July 7, 2009, and remains uncharted.

The majority of the singles from the album did not chart well. 'Shattered' received some Canadian radio airplay, but was not a single.

Four singles from the album were used in television shows, movies and advertisements:

Television 
"Bounce with Me" was used in Moonlight, Brothers & Sisters, Gossip Girl, The Hills, Entourage, Lipstick Jungle and Ugly Betty (in the episode "Burning Questions").
"Simple" was used in Ugly Betty in the episode "Ugly Berry".
"Passion" was used by Desperate Housewives for the 2008 North American radio and television commercial campaign and also in The Hills.
"Chains of Love" was used in Lipstick Jungle.

Films 
"Bounce with Me" was used in You Again and What Happens in Vegas.

Advertisements 
"Bounce With Me" was used in one of Nikon's 2008 global commercials featuring Ashton Kutcher, in Nike's 2008 national woman's campaign and in a Kit Kat 2009 national commercial that also starred "Kreesha Turner"
"Passion" was used by Playtex in a 2009 national commercial

Track listing

Charts

References

2008 albums
Kreesha Turner albums